Polycarpon alsinifolium, the fourleaf manyseed, is a species of biennial herb in the family Caryophyllaceae (carpetweeds).

Sources

References 

Flora of Malta
Caryophyllaceae